Honesdale Residential Historic District, is a national historic district located at Honesdale, Wayne County, Pennsylvania. The district includes 289 contributing buildings and 5 contributing sites in a predominantly residential neighborhood of Honesdale.  The residences were built between 1830 and 1940, in a variety of popular architectural styles including Greek Revival, Italianate, Bungalow / American Craftsman, Colonial Revival, Second Empire, Queen Anne.  The larger homes are typically -story, wood-frame dwellings with hipped and gable roofs.  The district also includes some former factories, such as the Irving Cut Glass Co. and Honesdale Show Company, and a former Armory.  The contributing sites consist of four cemeteries and Riverside Park.

It was added to the National Register of Historic Places in 1997.

References

Historic districts on the National Register of Historic Places in Pennsylvania
Italianate architecture in Pennsylvania
Greek Revival architecture in Pennsylvania
Colonial Revival architecture in Pennsylvania
Queen Anne architecture in Pennsylvania
Buildings and structures in Wayne County, Pennsylvania
National Register of Historic Places in Wayne County, Pennsylvania